"Neighbourhood Watch" is a horror short story by Australian writer Greg Egan. It was first published in the Australian magazine Aphelion in 1987, and reprinted in The Year's Best Horror Stories in 1988.

Plot summary

In order to eliminate local crime, a town council signs a contract with a demon, intending that the demon devour anyone who breaks the law after 11pm.

Reception
The Science Fiction Research Association called the story "outstanding", and said that by selecting the story to be published in The Year's Best Horror Stories and thereby bringing Egan's work to a wider audience, editor Karl Wagner could "be credited with at least one major 'discovery'."

References

External links
 Text of the story

1987 short stories
Horror short stories
Australian short stories
Short stories by Greg Egan
Works originally published in Australian magazines
Works originally published in science fiction magazines